Miroslav Todorov (born 26 June 1985) is a Bulgarian footballer, who plays as a midfielder for Botev Ihtiman.

Todorov previously played for Rodopa Smolyan, Botev Plovdiv and Pirin Blagoevgrad in the A PFG.

References

External links

1985 births
Living people
Bulgarian footballers
First Professional Football League (Bulgaria) players
PFC Rodopa Smolyan players
Botev Plovdiv players
PFC Pirin Blagoevgrad players
FC Sportist Svoge players
FC Lyubimets players
FC Vitosha Bistritsa players
PFC Minyor Pernik players
FC Tsarsko Selo Sofia players
Place of birth missing (living people)
Association football midfielders